Günter Kowalewski (born 31 October 1943) is a German former wrestler who competed in the 1972 Summer Olympics. He was born in Dortmund.

References

1943 births
Living people
Olympic wrestlers of West Germany
Wrestlers at the 1972 Summer Olympics
German male sport wrestlers
Sportspeople from Dortmund